Kuntur Uta (Aymara kunturi condor, uta house, "condor house", also spelled Condor Uta) is a  mountain in the Andes of Bolivia. It is located in the Oruro Department, Challapata Province, Challapata Municipality. Kuntur Uta lies at the Berenguela River, west of the village of Ancacato.

References 

Mountains of Oruro Department